Phrynops williamsi, also known commonly as Williams' side-necked turtle, Williams' South American sideneck turtle, William's [sic] South American side-necked turtle, William's [sic] toadhead turtle, and Williams' toadhead turtle, is a species of turtle in the family Chelidae. The species is endemic to South America.

Etymology
The specific name, williamsi, is in honor of American herpetologist Ernest E. Williams.

Geographic range
P. williamsi is found in southeastern Brazil, Uruguay, and Argentina.

Habitat

References

Further reading
Borteiro, Claudio; Kolenc, Francisco; Prigioni, Carlos (2015). "A new noteworthy record of Phrynops williamsi Rhodin & Mittermeier (Testudines, Chelidae) in Uruguay". Cuadernos de Herpetología 29 (1): 95–96.
Buskirk, James R. (1989). "Field observations on Phrynops williamsi and other Uruguayan chelonians". Vivarium 1 (4): 8–11.
Cabrera, Mario R. (1993). "Phrynops williamsi (Williams' South American Sideneck Turtle). Argentina: Corrientes". Herpetological Review 24 (2): 65–66.

External links

williamsi
Turtles of South America
Reptiles of Argentina
Reptiles of Brazil
Reptiles of Uruguay
Reptiles described in 1983